The Miami Story is a 1954 American film noir crime film directed by Fred F. Sears and starring Barry Sullivan, Luther Adler and Adele Jergens. It was produced by Sam Katzman for distribution by Columbia Pictures. The film features an introduction by Florida senator George Smathers.

Plot
Miami mob boss Tony Brill and hit man Ted Delacorte continue to elude the law. A scheme is hatched by attorney Frank Alton to bring former murder suspect Mick Flagg out of hiding, hoping he can infiltrate Brill's outfit.

Flagg reluctantly agrees. He leaves young son Gil with a Florida family, then gains Brill's trust, as well as that of Holly Abbott, whose sister Gwen is now the girlfriend of Brill.

Although he succeeds in disrupting Brill's business interests, Flagg is helpless to prevent Holly from being physically assaulted and Gil kidnapped. Holly betrays her sister, resulting in Gwen's arrest. A trap is set for Brill and Delacorte, who attempt to flee on a speedboat but are nabbed by the law.

Cast
 Barry Sullivan as Mick Flagg, aka Mike Pierce
 Luther Adler as Tony Brill
 John Baer as Ted Delacorte
 Adele Jergens as Gwen Abbott
 Beverly Garland as Holly Abbott
 Dan Riss as Frank Alton
 Damian O'Flynn as Police Chief Martin Belman
 Chris Alcaide as Robert Bishop
 Gene Darcy as Johnny Loker
 George E. Stone as Louie Mott
 David Kasday as 	Gil Flagg 
 Wheaton Chambers as Harry Dobey, Editor 
 John Hamilton as Clifton Staley 
 Al Hill as 	Simmons, Detective
 Lili St. Cyr as 	Stripper

References

External links
 
 
 
Review of film at Variety

1954 films
1954 crime films
American crime films
American black-and-white films
Films set in Miami
Columbia Pictures films
Films directed by Fred F. Sears
1950s English-language films
1950s American films